Ádám Decker (born 29 February 1984) is a  Hungarian male water polo player. He is part of the Hungary men's national water polo team. He won a gold medal at the 2013 World Championships. He is the older brother of Attila Decker water polo player.

See also
 List of world champions in men's water polo
 List of World Aquatics Championships medalists in water polo

References

External links

 

1984 births
Living people
Hungarian male water polo players
Place of birth missing (living people)
Olympic water polo players of Hungary
Water polo players at the 2016 Summer Olympics
World Aquatics Championships medalists in water polo